Le Roncole (today known as Roncole Verdi) is a village in the province of Parma (Emilia-Romagna region) of Italy, a frazione of the comune of Busseto. It is located  140 km southeast of Milan.  

It is best known as the birthplace on 9 or 10 October 1813 of opera composer Giuseppe Verdi. He retained a residence in the area almost his entire life, and wrote to Count Opprandino Arrivabene in 1863 from Paris where it had been rumoured that he was intending to live in France: "I was, am and always will be a peasant from Roncole." The house has been a national monument since 1901.

The composer's birthplace, the "Casa Natale del Maestro", can be visited, as can the organ used by the young Verdi in the church a few kilometers away.

References
Notes

Sources
 Associazione Amici di Verdi (ed.), Con Verdi nella sua terra, Busetto, 1997
 Mordacci, Alessandra (2001), (trans. Studio Dott. Annita Brindani), An Itinerary of History and Art in the Places of Verdi, Busseto: Busseto Tourist Office
Phillips-Matz, Mary Jane (1993), Verdi: A Biography, London & New York: Oxford University Press.

External links
Busseto Tourist Office website

Frazioni of the Province of Parma
Cities and towns in Emilia-Romagna
Giuseppe Verdi